The 2000 Wells Fargo Sun Bowl featured the UCLA Bruins and the Wisconsin Badgers.

Wisconsin opened the scoring, after quarterback Brooks Bollinger threw a 54-yard touchdown pass to wide receiver Lee Evans for an early 7–0 lead. UCLA responded when Cory Paus threw a 64-yard touchdown pass to Freddie Mitchell to even the score at 7. UCLA's Chris Griffin added a 31-yard field goal to push UCLA's lead to 10–7.

In the second quarter, running back DeShaun Foster rushed 7 yards for a touchdown, to increase the lead to 17–7. In the third quarter, Chris Griffin kicked his second field goal of the game, a 25 yarder, to move the lead to 20–7. Brooks Bollinger later found wide receiver Chris Chambers for a 3-yard touchdown pass, cutting the lead to 20–14. Michael Bennett's 6-yard touchdown run gave the Badgers a 21–20 lead, and eventually the ball game.

References

External links
 USA Today recap of game

Sun Bowl
Sun Bowl
UCLA Bruins football bowl games
Wisconsin Badgers football bowl games
December 2000 sports events in the United States
2000 in sports in Texas